Matthew Spence (born 7 April 1976) is a former professional rugby league footballer and coach. His position of preference was in the second row, although he also played as prop occasionally.

Early years
Born in New Zealand, Matthew grew up playing for the Turangi Dambusters in the Bay of Plenty competition.

Spence also played for the Junior Kiwis.

Playing career
Spence then moved to Australia, joining the Parramatta Eels and making his first grade debut in 1995. He impressed many in his rookie season and was awarded the Eric Grothe Rookie of the Year award at Parramatta. However he needed a knee reconstruction in 1997 and this injury plagued his next two seasons at the Eels.

He signed for the Western Suburbs Magpies in 1999 and looked to rebuild his career. However, before the season had started he failed a NRL drug test, testing positive for ecstasy. He was the first player to be suspended under the NRL's new drug rules and received a seven-week suspension.

With the Magpies merging with Balmain for the 2000 season he was forced to move clubs again and returned home to New Zealand to play for the Auckland Warriors. He was not re-signed by the new owners in 2001 and retired. When not required by the Warriors in 2000, Spence was assigned to play for the Newtown Jets. He played for the Northcote Tigers in the 2002 Bartercard Cup.

Later years
In 2003 Spence was the player-coach of the new Tihoi club in the Waicoa Bay club competition.

In 2009 and 2010 Spence was the player-coach for the Turangi Dambusters in the Bay of Plenty premier competition, his old junior club.

References

Sources
 

1976 births
Living people
New Zealand rugby league players
New Zealand Warriors players
New Zealand rugby league coaches
Newtown Jets NSW Cup players
Northcote Tigers players
Parramatta Eels players
Rugby league players from the Bay of Plenty Region
Rugby league second-rows
Place of birth missing (living people)
Junior Kiwis players
Western Suburbs Magpies players